Saroya is a village in the tehsil town Balachaur, located in the Sahid Bhagat Singh District of Punjab, India. It is an ancient village tracing its roots to pre Independence era , when it was home to a majority of muslims. Even today houses from that era still exist here.

Villages in Shaheed Bhagat Singh Nagar district